Vinyl Films is an American film and television production company founded by producer and director, Cameron Crowe. He launched the film and television production company in 1996.

Films
 Jerry Maguire (1996)
 Almost Famous (2000)
 Vanilla Sky (2001)
 Elizabethtown (2005)
 Pearl Jam Twenty (2011)
 We Bought a Zoo (2011)
 Aloha (2015)
 David Crosby: Remember My Name (2019)

References

External links
 Website
 Vinyl Films at the IMDb

Film production companies of the United States